Makarika  is a rural community and valley in the Gisborne District of New Zealand's North Island. It is located just south of Ruatoria and Hiruharama, off State Highway 35.
The Penu Pā includes a memorial to Private Parekura Makarini McLean, who was killed in combat in Egypt in 1941, during World War II.

A post office operated in the valley from 1930 to 1970. It was operated by the Matariki Station farm for most of that time.

Marae

The area has two marae belonging to hapū of Ngāti Porou iwi. Rongoitekai or Penu Marae and Rongo i te Kai meeting house is a meeting place of Te Aitanga a Mate. Rongohaere or Te Pahou Marae and Rongohaere meeting house is a meeting place of Te Aitanga a Mate and Te Whānau a Rākairoa, and also of Te Whānau-ā-Apanui hapū of Te Whānau a Rutaia.

In October 2020, the Government committed $5,756,639 from the Provincial Growth Fund to upgrade both marae and 27 other Ngāti Porou marae. The funding was expected to create 205 jobs.

Education
Makarika School is a Year 1–8 co-educational state primary school. In 2019, it was a decile 1 school with a roll of 25.

References

Populated places in the Gisborne District